Miloslav Bednařík (30 January 1965 – 16 June 1989) was a shooter from Czechoslovakia.  He represented his native country at the 1988 Summer Olympics in Seoul, where he received the silver medal in the trap event.

Bednařík was killed in a motorcycle accident at the age of 24.

References

1965 births
1989 deaths
Sportspeople from Olomouc
Czechoslovak male sport shooters
Motorcycle road incident deaths
Olympic medalists in shooting
Olympic shooters of Czechoslovakia
Olympic silver medalists for Czechoslovakia
Shooters at the 1988 Summer Olympics
Trap and double trap shooters
Road incident deaths in Czechoslovakia

Medalists at the 1988 Summer Olympics
Czech male sport shooters